Judith O'Dea (born April 20, 1945) is an American actress. She portrayed Barbra in the 1968 George Romero classic horror film Night of the Living Dead.

Career

In addition to her signature role, O'Dea has appeared in the television movie The Pirate in the 1970s. She later took a break from acting to focus on raising her family.

In the 2000s, O'Dea returned to acting in several low-budget horror films, including Claustrophobia, October Moon and Women's Studies. She also returned to the Barbra role for Night of the Living Dead: Genesis.

She owns and operates O'Dea Communications, a firm that deals in oral-communications training.

Filmography

References

External links

.

1945 births
Actresses from Pittsburgh
American film actresses
Living people
21st-century American women